Wretham is a civil parish in the Breckland district of Norfolk, England. It also includes the villages of Illington and Stonebridge. The 2011 Census recorded a parish population of 374 people in 141 households.

History
The place-name "Wretham" is derived from Old English. It means "the hām (place) where crosswort grew".

The Church of England parish church of St Ethelbert in East Wretham was built in the 12th century and rebuilt in 1865. It is a Grade II* listed building.

The former parish church of St Lawrence in West Wretham was built in the 14th century and is now a ruin. It is a Scheduled Monument and Grade II listed building.

RAF East Wretham was a Royal Air Force air station. It was commissioned in 1940 and operational until November 1945. It was then a resettlement camp for Polish refugees until 1946. The former air station is now part of the British Army's Stanford Training Area (STANTA).

The licensee of the Dog and Partridge local pub opposed the smoking ban that was introduced in England in July 2007.

References

Bibliography

External links

Wretham Village Website

Breckland District
Civil parishes in Norfolk